Ellerslie Rugby Park is a park located in South Edmonton in the neighborhood of Ellerslie. It was the Edmonton Gold's home field and it also held puts on many private events. There are two buildings on the site, the Banquet Room, and the Clubroom. It was opened in 1984 and closed in 2022.

The park was a major venue for the 2006 Women's Rugby World Cup, hosting nine pool matches, both semifinals, and four classification matches.

References

Sports venues in Edmonton
Athletics (track and field) venues in Canada
Multi-purpose stadiums in Canada
Rugby union stadiums in Canada
Rugby union in Alberta
Sports venues completed in 1984
1984 establishments in Alberta